The men's individual recurve competition at the 2015 European Games took place from 16–22 June 2015 in the Tofiq Bahramov Stadium in Baku, Azerbaijan.

64 archers entered the competition, with a maximum of three entries per country.

Ranking round
The ranking round took place on 16 June 2015 to determine the seeding for the knockout rounds. It consisted of two rounds of 36 arrows, with a maximum score of 720. 
World rankings shown are correct at tournament start date.

Elimination rounds

Finals

Section 1

Section 2

Section 3

Section 4

References

Men's individual